Aleksandra Urban  (born 17 March 1978) is a Polish painter. Diploma in painting at the Faculty of Painting and Sculpture at the Academy of Fine Arts in Wrocław. Scholarships of the Ministry of Culture and National Heritage in 1998 and 2003.

External links
Biography
Aleksandra Urban at culture.pl

1978 births
Living people
20th-century Polish painters
21st-century Polish painters
Polish women painters
People from Jelenia Góra
20th-century Polish women